One in a Million (often abbreviated OIAM) is a Malaysian reality-competition show. It is the first reality singing competition to offer a RM 1 million prize to the winner. The show began airing on 8TV, a terrestrial television station in Malaysia, on 26 May 2006.

One in a Million seeks to discover the best young singer in the country through several auditions held nationwide. The objective of awarding a large amount of prize money is to provide the winner with quality production and marketing resources. In the later stages of the competition the progress of the contestants is determined by public voting by phone or text messaging. This is also the first reality singing competition that allows viewers to vote in as well as vote out the contestants.

The show features two judges who critique the contestants' performances to facilitate the voting: former singer and music lecturer Syafinaz Selamat and brand manager for 8TV, Paul Moss. The show is hosted by Awal Ashaari and Marion Caunter.

Regulations
One in a Million is open to all Malaysian residents aged 16 to 32 during the taping of the program. A unique feature of the show is that recording artistes, established or otherwise, can take part in this contest, as displayed by popular singers Dayang Nurfaizah and Siti Sarah Raisuddin.

To be eligible, contestants must not be permanent and/or contract employees of the television station 8TV or its sister stations under Media Prima Berhad. Contestants must also not be representatives, employees, servants and/or agents of advertising or promotion service providers of 8TV, and their immediate family member.

Format

Auditions
The producers of the show hold open public auditions at locations across the country, where anyone who is eligible can attend. Hopefuls audition before the judges at several venues across the country.

A selection of the auditions in front of the judges – usually the best, the worst and the most bizarre – are broadcast over the first few weeks of the show. Each contestant enters the audition room, often after waiting for hours, and delivers either an a cappella or accompanied by their own guitar or keyboard instrument. If at least one of the two judges say "yes", then the contestant goes through to the next filter, otherwise the contestant is sent home. Filtering the auditions hopefuls before the next round varies by season.

Central Elimination and Knock-out
Contestants who passed the auditions are split into groups in the Central Elimination. Contestants are asked to perform in front of the judges again and are narrowed down to forty.

The Top 40 contestants are put through the 'Blind Test' and 'Style/Presentation' Test. In the 'Blind Test', the contestants had to perform behind a screen. In the 'Style/Presentation' round, two guest judges judge the style and presentation of each contestant.

The 20 contestants who moved forward are ranked according to their performances. The contestants ranked Top 10 must then pick an opposing contestant from the Bottom 10 to compete against. Out of these 10 pairs, only one contestant from each pair may move on as decided by the judges.

Finals
The finals last ten weeks during which each of the Final 12 contestants perform one song each week. The format changes with contestants singing two songs each week when there are only four contestants remaining. After each contestant has performed, the judges comment on their performance, usually focusing on vocal ability and stage presence. Once all the contestants have appeared, the voting lines open at the end of the show and the viewers vote to keep singers on the show or off. The judges, from this point on, serve almost entirely in an advisory capacity, with no direct influence on the results.

The results are only announced a week later on the following episode before the performances.

The winner receives a RM 1 million record deal with the record label Monkey Bone and will be managed by a management unit called The 8 Unit.

Judges & Hosts

Judges

 Syafinaz Selamat
 Paul Moss

Hosts

Awal Ashaari
Awal has hosted several TV programs and has appeared in several drama series and movies. Prior to hosting One in a Million Awal had  made it to the Top 30 on the first season of Malaysian Idol.

Marion Caunter

Season summary

Season 1 (2006)

Season 2 (2007-2008)

Season 3 (2009)

Seasons

Season One (2006)

Season Two (2007–08)

Season Three (2008–09)

Performances on One in a Million

One in a Million Diary
A spin-off titled One in a Million Diary debuted after the Top 8 show during the first season. It aired on Wednesdays at 9.30p.m. and featured off-stage video clips as well as exclusive weekly interviews with the contestants.

See also
Malaysian Idol
Paul Moss
8TV

References

External links
Official Website Season 1 & 2
Official Website Season 3
TV Station
Audition FAQ

 
2006 Malaysian television series debuts
2009 Malaysian television series endings
2000s Malaysian television series
Malaysian reality television series
8TV (Malaysian TV network) original programming